Isabel Mundry (born 20 April 1963) is a German composer.

Life and work
Isabel Mundry was born in Schlüchtern (Germany) in 1963 and studied composition at the Hochschule der Künste and electronic music, musicology and history at the Berlin Technische Universität. From 1991 to 1994 she taught at the Hochschule der Künste Berlin and furthered her studies in Frankfurt with Hans Zender and later researched at the IRCAM in Paris. In addition to her teaching activities in Berlin, she held teaching appointments in Zürich and at the Frankfurt University of Music and Performing Arts.

Isabel Mundry was the first resident composer of the Staatskapelle in Dresden. She previously held a similar position at the Tong Yong Festival, the Lucerne Festival and the Mannheim National Theater.

Mundry's compositions are characterized by a highly individualized musical language, full of variants and nuances: "She hardly ever repeats herself; each time, sounds and sequences of sounds are articulated differently." Isabel Mundry's work is currently published by Breitkopf & Härtel.

She was one of the top 10 performed composers on the Internationalen Ferienkurse für Neue Musik between 1946 and 2014.

Awards 
 Boris Blacher Composition Award from Berlin University of the Arts and Hochschule für Musik "Hanns Eisler"
 1994  of the Academy of Arts, Berlin
 1996: Kranichstein Music Award of the Darmstädter Ferienkurse
 1996: Schneider-Schott Music Prize with Moritz Eggert
 2001: Composer Award of the Ernst von Siemens Music Prize
 2012: Zender Award  with Martin Zenck

References

External links
 List of works by Isabel Mundry from Musinfo – The Database of Swiss Music
 
 Works of Isabel Mundry published by Breitkopf & Härtel
 
 Andreas Dorschel: Mundrys Nuancen (2015)
Sound recordings of works of the composer from the archives of SRG SSR on Neo.Mx3

1963 births
Living people
20th-century classical composers
Berlin University of the Arts alumni
Frankfurt University of Music and Performing Arts alumni
Members of the Academy of Arts, Berlin
Academic staff of the Zurich University of the Arts
German women classical composers
Women classical composers
20th-century German composers
Ernst von Siemens Composers' Prize winners
German classical composers
20th-century women composers
German expatriates in Switzerland
20th-century German women musicians
21st-century classical composers
21st-century German composers
21st-century women composers